St. Albans Bay is an unincorporated village in the town of St. Albans, Franklin County, Vermont, United States. St. Albans Bay has a post office with ZIP code 05481.

References

Unincorporated communities in Franklin County, Vermont
Unincorporated communities in Vermont